Chemplast Cricket Ground or Indian Institute of Technology Chemplast Ground is a cricket ground in the IIT Madras campus. The ground is an important cricket venue and is described by cricketer Sachin Tendulkar as the most scenic in the country. It is set amongst greenery.

The ground has hosted eight Women's cricket ODI. The first match record at ground was in 2003 India Women's and New Zealand Women's.

References

External links 

 Cricketarchive
 Cricinfo
 Wikimapia

Cricket grounds in Tamil Nadu
Sports venues in Chennai
University sports venues in India
Indian Institute of Technology Madras
Sports venues completed in 1998
1998 establishments in Tamil Nadu
20th-century architecture in India